Ana Belén Pontón Mondelo (born 27 July 1977) is a Spanish politician for the Galician Nationalist Bloc (BNG). She has served in the Parliament of Galicia since 2004, and in 2016 was the first woman to be elected spokesperson of the BNG. In 2020, with a record vote in the regional election, she became Leader of the Opposition.

Biography
Pontón was born in the village of Chorrente near Sarria in the Province of Lugo, and grew up in a house that her great-grandfather had built in 1904. She graduated in Political Sciences from the University of Santiago de Compostela.

Pontón was first elected to the Parliament of Galicia in 2004. In February 2016, she received 85% of the votes to be the party's national spokesperson, the first woman in the role.

In the July 2020 Galician elections, the BNG's vote share under Pontón jumped from 8.3% to 23.7%, and its seats from six to a record 19. The result made the party the second largest in Parliament after the People's Party of regional president Alberto Núñez Feijóo, and Pontón became Leader of the Opposition.

Personal life
In January 2020, Pontón gave birth to her first daughter in Santiago de Compostela.

References

1977 births
Living people
People from Sarria (comarca)
University of Santiago de Compostela alumni
Galician Nationalist Bloc politicians
Leaders of political parties in Spain
Members of the 6th Parliament of Galicia
Members of the 7th Parliament of Galicia
Members of the 8th Parliament of Galicia
Members of the 9th Parliament of Galicia
Members of the 10th Parliament of Galicia